Count Basie Meets Oscar Peterson – The Timekeepers is a 1978 album by Oscar Peterson and Count Basie. It was recorded on Frbruary 21-22, 1978.

Track listing
 "Confessin'" (Doc Daugherty, Al J. Neiburg, Ellis Reynolds) – 4:51
 "Soft Winds" (Benny Goodman, Fletcher Henderson) – 4:28
 "Rent Party" (Count Basie, Oscar Peterson) – 9:27
 "(Back Home Again In) Indiana" (James F. Hanley, Ballard MacDonald) – 3:11
 "Hey, Raymond" (Basie, Peterson) – 5:34
 "After You've Gone" (Henry Creamer, Turner Layton) – 4:56
 "That's the One" (Basie, Peterson) – 5:12

Personnel
Recorded February 21, 22, 1978 in Los Angeles:

 Count Basie – piano, organ
 Oscar Peterson – piano
 Louie Bellson – drums
 John Heard – double bass
 Val Valentin – engineer
 Norman Granz – producer, liner notes

References

1978 albums
Count Basie albums
Oscar Peterson albums
Albums produced by Norman Granz
Pablo Records albums